Giusto Priola (born 26 May 1990) is an Italian football player. He plays for  club Seregno.

Club career
He made his Serie C debut for Trapani on 4 September 2011 in a game against Prato.

On 10 October 2019 he signed with Picerno.

On 7 August 2021 he joined Giarre in Serie D.

References

External links
 

1990 births
Footballers from Palermo
Living people
Italian footballers
Association football defenders
Trapani Calcio players
Bassano Virtus 55 S.T. players
U.S. Catanzaro 1929 players
U.S. Pistoiese 1921 players
A.C. Renate players
A.S. Bisceglie Calcio 1913 players
A.S.D. Giarre Calcio 1946 players
U.S. 1913 Seregno Calcio players
Serie B players
Serie C players
Serie D players